Domenico Passuello (born 24 March 1978) is an Italian professional triathlete and former road cyclist.

His father Giuseppe was also a professional cyclist.

Triathlon results

Cycling career

Major results

2002
 4th Tour du Lac Leman
 6th Giro d'Oro
 9th Overall Brixia Tour
2003
 9th Route Adélie
2004
 6th Giro d'Oro
 7th Trofeo dell'Etna
 9th Tour du Lac Leman
2005
 3rd Trofeo Franco Balestra

References

External links

1978 births
Living people
Italian male cyclists
Sportspeople from Livorno
Italian male triathletes
Cyclists from Tuscany